Deh-e Shir or Deh Shir or Dehshir or Deh-i-Shir, also rendered as Deshir, may refer to various places in Iran:
Deh Shir, Kuhbanan, Kerman Province
Deh Shir, Ravar, Kerman Province
Deh Shir, Sirjan, Kerman Province
Deh-e Shir, Khuzestan
Deh-e Shir Khan
Dehshir, Yazd
Deh Shir, Zanjan
Dehshir-e Olya, Zanjan Province
Dehshir-e Sofla, Zanjan Province
Dehshir Rural District, in Yazd Province